The Congress of Neurological Surgeons (CNS) is a professional association representing neurosurgeons, neurosurgical residents, medical students, and allied health professionals.

History 
World War II produced a dramatic change in the world of neurological surgery. Deployed surgeons learned neurosurgery while on active duty in one of the armed services. Others experienced either abbreviated training, or had their program interrupted when called to active duty. After the war these surgeons returned to the United States with a need to add credentials. Existing neurosurgical training programs incorporated these surgeons and the number of training sites proliferated. Thus, in the late 1940s there was an explosion in the numbers of young neurosurgeons surfacing in communities and seeking recognition from organized neurosurgical societies. There was intense resistance from the established neurosurgical community, however, to this new group of neurosurgeons. The Harvey Cushing Society (now the AANS), did not immediately recognize this new group of neurosurgeons and made efforts to exclude them from their organization. The precursor to the CNS was the Interurban Neurosurgical Society organized by neurosurgeons Adrian Verbrugghen and Harold Voris meeting at the University Club of Chicago. The society was open to all neurosurgeons living no more than one travel day away from Chicago. It met for one day only (Saturday). There was a mailing list but no dues, by-laws, officers or publications. About 150 neurosurgeons attended once a year. Most attendees were from the northeast, mid-Atlantic, southeast, and mid-west. Eventually, a more organized effort was put together when twenty two neurosurgeons met in St. Louis, Missouri. In 1951, the first formal organizing and scientific meeting was convened in Memphis, Tennessee, attended by 121 neurosurgeons. The CNS was infolded into the AANS for several years until it held its own independent meeting in 2000, completing the separation of the two organizations. The CNS has expanded significantly and now has over 10,000 members worldwide.

Education and certification 
The CNS exists to enhance health and improve lives through the advancement of neurosurgical education and scientific exchange. Our mission drives us to cultivate great neurosurgeons. We advance the global practice of neurosurgery globally by inspiring and facilitating scientific discovery and its translation to clinical practice.

The CNS has multiple efforts aimed at advancing neurosurgical education to practicing neurosurgeons, resident neurosurgeons, and medical students. These efforts include online products such as Nexus, assorted podcasts, and a variety of webinars, and live courses such as the Leadership in Healthcare course, the CNS Annual Meeting, and Self Assessment in Neurological Surgery. Many of these educational efforts provide credits for continuing medical education. The CNS also holds courses for written and oral board review, as well as webinars on these same and other topics. Board certified neurosurgeons must successfully pass a Maintenance of Certification exam in order to remain board certified by the American Board of Neurological Surgeons.  A component of re-certification is successful completion of the Self Assessment in Neurological Surgery examination every 3 years.

The CNS Annual Meeting features sessions including dinner and luncheon seminars, case-based sessions, and the opportunity to share scientific abstracts with the community.

Publications 
The official medical journal of the CNS is Neurosurgery. The CNS also produces Clinical Neurosurgery, Operative Neurosurgery, and Neurosurgery Open. Additionally, the CNS publishes CNS Quarterly, which updates members on various CNS activities including socio-economic and political activities of the organization on a quarterly basis.

Neurosurgery provides a medium for the prompt publication of scientific articles dealing with clinical or experimental neurosurgery, reviews, and other information of interest to neurosurgeons.

Operative Neurosurgery is focused on the technical aspects of the discipline featuring operative procedures, anatomy, instrumentation, devices, and technology. Operative Neurosurgery is the practical resource for material that connects the surgeon directly to the operating room.

Clinical Neurosurgery, published annually as a supplement to Neurosurgery, is the official register of the CNS Annual Meeting.

Neurosurgery Open is an online-only, fully Open Access publication with all content publishing under the Creative Commons Attribution CC-BY-NC-ND, unless an alternative is required by a funding body. Content published in Neurosurgery Open publishes on a rolling basis with issues closed quarterly. Neurosurgery Open provides an outlet for the publication of scientific papers dealing with clinical neurosurgery and experimental neurosurgery, such as case series, clinical studies and other information of interest to neurosurgeons.

Annual meeting 
The CNS holds its five-day annual meeting in the autumn of each year. The meeting covers all aspects of neurosurgical research, including basic, translational, and clinical. Presentations are made in oral and poster format. Attending the annual meeting provides medical attendees with numerous continuing medical education credits. The meeting also features named lectures, notably Dandy Lecture, named in honor of neurosurgical pioneer Walter E. Dandy, and a Distinguished Service Award.

Advocacy 
The Washington Committee advocates for neurosurgery in the following areas:

 Medical malpractice reform
 Tort reform
 Adequate Medicare reimbursement
 Pay-for-performance issues
 Emergency Medical Treatment and Active Labor Act issues
 Patient safety issues
In addition, the Washington staff maintains the Neurosurgery Blog which highlights the latest legislative activities affecting health care and the neurosurgical specialty.

Founder's Laurel 
Each year the CNS recognizes exceptional service, lifelong dedication, and meritorious accomplishments in the field of medical education. Previous awardees have been:

Distinguished Service Award 
The Distinguished Service Award is an award to honor the contributions and activities of outstanding individuals and members of the CNS. The legacy, accomplishments, and contributions of prior award recipients is remarkable.

References 

Neurosurgery organizations
Surgical organizations based in the United States
Organizations established in 1951
Medical and health organizations based in Illinois
1951 establishments in Illinois